WDZN (99.5 FM) is an active rock formatted broadcast radio station licensed to Midland, Maryland, serving the Frostburg/Cumberland area. WDZN is owned and operated by West Virginia Radio Corporation.

History
Originally known as WVMD, the station was scheduled to begin broadcasting sometime in early 2007, but finally launched with a smooth jazz format on April 1, 2008, at 12:00 midnight. Later that afternoon, a man named "Stu" claimed to have broken into and taken the radio station "hostage", playing only Country and demanding that the owner of the station bring back the John Boy and Billy show. John Boy and Billy had previously aired on WQZK, then an active rock station, which West Virginia Radio Corporation purchased in December 2006 and subsequently changed the format to Contemporary Hit Radio.

On the afternoon of April 2, it was announced that the smooth jazz format and the man named "Stu" were part of an April Fools' Day joke and that the station would in fact, be carrying a country music format.

The 99.5 frequency was previously home to a translator of Cumberland area radio station WCBC-FM.

Locally produced "Sunday Morning Bluegrass", which was previously heard on WROG, moved to WVMD on September 7, 2008.

On August 10, 2012, the station changed its call sign and its format to WDZN as part of a swap with its Romney, West Virginia-based sister station, 100.1 FM.

On October 3, 2016, WDZN changed their format from active rock to classic hits.

On February 7, 2022, at 9am, WDZN changed their format from classic hits to active rock, branded as "99.5 DZN", with the first song being "Smells Like Teen Spirit" by Nirvana.

FM Booster
WDZN's transmitter is located near Frostburg and the station's main signal has trouble reaching downtown Cumberland.

As such, West Virginia Radio Corporation applied for an FM booster, WDZN-FM1, located in Cumberland.  The booster's antenna is located off Virginia Avenue, near Queen Street near the center of the city.  This central location allows the booster to provide complete coverage of Cumberland.

Previous logos

References

External links
WDZN website

DZN
Active rock radio stations in the United States